Henry Carscallen (14 August 1845 – 16 September 1906) was an Ontario barrister and political figure. He represented Hamilton East in the Legislative Assembly of Ontario as a Conservative member from 1898 to 1906.

He was born in Saltfleet Township, Wentworth County, Canada West, the son of John Thomas Carscallen. Carscallen served on Hamilton city council for 12 years. He was named Queen's Counsel in 1890. He died in office in 1906.

References
Canadian Parliamentary Guide, 1901, AJ Magurn

External links
Member's parliamentary history for the Legislative Assembly of Ontario

1845 births
1906 deaths
Progressive Conservative Party of Ontario MPPs
Canadian King's Counsel